Les Essards may refer to the following communes in France:

 Les Essards, Charente, in the Charente département
 Les Essards, Charente-Maritime, in the Charente-Maritime département 
 Les Essards, Indre-et-Loire, in the Indre-et-Loire département
Les Essards-Taignevaux, in the Jura département

See also

Les Essarts (disambiguation)